The factorization of a linear partial differential operator (LPDO) is an important issue in the theory of integrability, due to the Laplace-Darboux transformations, which allow construction of integrable LPDEs.  Laplace solved the factorization problem for a bivariate hyperbolic operator of the second order (see Hyperbolic partial differential equation), constructing two Laplace invariants. Each Laplace invariant is an explicit polynomial condition of factorization; coefficients of this polynomial are explicit functions of the coefficients of the initial LPDO.  The polynomial conditions of factorization are called invariants because they have the same form for equivalent (i.e. self-adjoint) operators.

Beals-Kartashova-factorization (also called BK-factorization) is a constructive procedure to factorize a bivariate operator of the arbitrary order and arbitrary form. Correspondingly, the factorization conditions in this case also have polynomial form, are invariants and coincide with Laplace invariants for bivariate hyperbolic operators of the second order. The factorization procedure is purely algebraic, the number of possible factorizations depending on the number of simple roots of the Characteristic polynomial (also called symbol) of the initial LPDO and reduced LPDOs appearing at each factorization step. Below the factorization procedure is described for a bivariate operator of arbitrary form, of order 2 and 3. Explicit factorization formulas for an operator of the order  can be found in General invariants are defined in and invariant formulation of the Beals-Kartashova factorization is given in

Beals-Kartashova Factorization

Operator of order 2

Consider an operator

with smooth coefficients and look for a factorization

Let us write down the equations on  explicitly, keeping in
mind the rule of left composition, i.e. that 
 

Then in all cases

where the notation  is used.

Without loss of generality,  i.e.   and  it can be taken as 1,   Now solution of the system of 6 equations on the variables 
  
can be found in three steps. 

At the first step, the roots of a quadratic polynomial have to be found. 

At the second step, a linear system of two algebraic equations has to be solved.

At the third step, one algebraic condition   has to be checked.

Step 1.
Variables  
      
can be found from the first three equations, 

The (possible) solutions are then the functions of the roots of a quadratic polynomial:

Let   be a root of the polynomial 
then

Step 2.
Substitution of the results obtained at the first step, into the next two equations

yields linear system of two algebraic equations:

In particularly, if the root  is simple,
i.e.

 then these
equations have the unique solution:

 

At this step, for each 
root of the polynomial  a corresponding set of  coefficients   is computed. 

Step 3.
Check factorization condition (which is the last of the initial 6 equations)

written in the known variables  and ):

If

the operator  is factorizable and explicit form for the factorization coefficients   is given above.

Operator of order 3
Consider an operator

with smooth coefficients and look for a factorization

Similar to the case of the operator   the conditions of factorization are described by the following system:

At the first step, the roots of a cubic polynomial 

have to be found. Again  denotes a root and first four coefficients are 

At the second step, a linear system of three algebraic equations has to be solved:

At the third step, two algebraic conditions   have to be checked.

Operator of order

Invariant Formulation

Definition The operators ,  are called
equivalent if there is a gauge transformation that takes one to the
other:

BK-factorization is then pure algebraic procedure which allows to
construct explicitly a factorization of an arbitrary order LPDO 
in the form

with first-order operator  where  is an arbitrary  simple root  of the characteristic polynomial 

Factorization is possible then for each simple root    iff

for 

for 

for 

and so on. All functions  are known functions, for instance, 

and so on.

Theorem  All functions 
 
are invariants under gauge transformations.

Definition Invariants  are
called generalized invariants of a bivariate operator of arbitrary
order.

In particular case of the bivariate hyperbolic operator  its generalized
invariants coincide with Laplace invariants (see Laplace invariant).

Corollary If an operator  is factorizable, then all
operators  equivalent to it, are also factorizable.

Equivalent operators are easy to compute:

and so on. Some example are given below:

Transpose

Factorization of an operator is the first step on the way of solving corresponding equation. But for solution we need right factors and BK-factorization constructs  left factors which are easy to construct. On the other hand, the existence of a certain right factor of a LPDO is equivalent to the existence of a corresponding left factor of the transpose of that operator.

Definition
The transpose  of an operator

is defined as

and the identity

implies that

Now the coefficients are

with a standard convention for binomial coefficients in several
variables (see Binomial coefficient), e.g. in two variables

In particular, for the operator  the coefficients are

For instance,  the operator 

is factorizable as

and its transpose   is factorizable then as

See also
 Partial derivative
 Invariant (mathematics)
 Invariant theory
 Characteristic polynomial

Notes

References 
 J. Weiss. Bäcklund transformation and the Painlevé property.  J. Math. Phys. 27, 1293-1305 (1986).
 R. Beals, E. Kartashova. Constructively factoring linear partial differential operators in two variables. Theor. Math. Phys. 145(2), pp. 1510-1523 (2005)  
   E. Kartashova. A Hierarchy of Generalized Invariants for Linear Partial Differential Operators. Theor. Math. Phys. 147(3), pp. 839-846 (2006) 
  E. Kartashova, O. Rudenko.  Invariant Form of BK-factorization and its Applications. Proc. GIFT-2006, pp.225-241, Eds.: J. Calmet, R. W. Tucker,  Karlsruhe University Press  (2006); arXiv

Multivariable calculus
Differential operators
Partial differential equations